In Finland, murder is defined as homicide with at least one of four aggravating factors:

  Intent
  Brutality or cruelty
  Endangering public safety
  Killing a public servant upholding public safety or because of his lawful duty.

Further, the offense considered as a whole must be aggravated. A murder doesn't expire.

For an adult of sound mind, the only possible punishment for murder is life imprisonment. Typically, the prisoner will be pardoned by the Helsinki Court of Appeals after serving 14 to 15 years, but this is not automatic. The President can also give pardon, and this used to be the only possibility. Juveniles (persons 15-17 years of age) and partially insane adult convicts can be sentenced to 2-12 years of imprisonment. Typically the punishment is 10-12 years for this special group. Partially insane convicts can also be sentenced to life imprisonment, especially if there are multiple victims or the crime is exceptionally severe. Multiple murderers aged 15-17 can be sentenced to at most 15 years of imprisonment.

In  jurisprudence, the comparison of an actual crime against the "brutal or cruel way" standard has been understood to mean comparison to "usual" homicide cases. In recent cases, the Finnish Supreme Court has not considered a single axe stroke on the head, or strangulation to be  "brutal or cruel". On the other hand, causing death by jumping on a person's chest and head and firing over 10 times on a person's torso have been considered to fulfill the standard.

Until  2006, a life sentence could be pardoned only by the president. However, since the 1960s, presidents have regularly given pardons to practically all offenders after a period of 12–15 years. In 2006, the legislation was changed so that all life sentences are reviewed by an appellate court after they have been executed for 12 years. If the convict is still deemed a danger to society, his or her case will be reviewed every two years after this. Involuntary confinement to a psychiatric institution may also result, sometimes after the sentence is served. The involuntary treatment ends when the psychiatrist decides, or when a court decrees it no longer necessary in a periodical review.

If the prerequisites are not  fulfilled, but the homicide has been deliberate and premeditated, the convict is sentenced for second degree murder (tappo)  to a minimum of eight years in prison. There is also the crime of voluntary manslaughter (surma), which is a homicide under mitigating/extenuating circumstances, with the punishment of four to ten years. Involuntary manslaughter (kuolemantuottamus) has a maximum punishment of two years of imprisonment or fine (see day fine), or at least four months and at most four years in case the negligence is considered aggravated. Infanticide "caused by the mental stress of birth" carries a punishment of at least four months and at most four years in prison.

Taking part in a murderous raid may be punished as murder even if the offender did not succeed in killing anyone. This was defined by a Supreme Court rejection of appeal in a case where a motorcycle gang attacked a rival gang at a pizzeria. The main defendant attempted to shoot three rival gangsters. The first was saved by a bullet-proof vest, the second was hit but lost two fingers, and with the third, the weapon malfunctioned and the targeted gangster survived. However, other attackers succeeded in murdering three people, and as the main defendant took part in planning and preparing the raid, he was also convicted of murder.

See also
List of murder laws by country

References

Murder in Finland
Law of Finland
Finland